The Journal of Research in International Education is a triannual peer-reviewed academic journal covering the field of education. The editor-in-chief is Mary Hayden (University of Bath). It was established in 2002 and is published by SAGE Publications.

Abstracting and indexing 
The journal is abstracted and indexed in ERIC, Education Index, Neuroscience Citation Index, and Scopus.

External links 
 

SAGE Publishing academic journals
English-language journals
Education journals
Publications established in 2002
Triannual journals